Francesco Saverio Mergalo (6 June 1746 – 12 April 1786) was an Italian painter of the Rococo or late-Baroque period, active near his natal city of Monteleone di Calabria. He was best known for his portraits.

He is described as being born poor and dying poor. He painted the ceiling of a church in Jonadi in Calabria.

References

1746 births
1786 deaths
People from the Province of Vibo Valentia
18th-century Italian painters
Italian male painters
Italian Baroque painters
18th-century Italian male artists